Eastern Enlargement Historic District is a national historic district located at Greencastle, Putnam County, Indiana.  The district encompasses 272 contributing buildings in a predominantly residential section of Greencastle.  The district developed between about 1840 and 1961 and includes notable examples of Greek Revival, Gothic Revival, Italianate, Queen Anne, Stick Style, and Bungalow / American Craftsman style architecture.  Located in the district are the separately listed Delta Kappa Epsilon Fraternity, F.P. Nelson House and William C. Van Arsdel House.  Other notable buildings include the Braman House (1840), James B. Nelson House, O'Hair House (c. 1885), John Ireland House, and a number of fraternity and sorority houses associated with DePauw University.

It was added to the National Register of Historic Places in 2011.

References

Historic districts on the National Register of Historic Places in Indiana
Greek Revival architecture in Indiana
Gothic Revival architecture in Indiana
Italianate architecture in Indiana
Queen Anne architecture in Indiana
Bungalow architecture in Indiana
Historic districts in Putnam County, Indiana
National Register of Historic Places in Putnam County, Indiana